The Hillman Gazelle is an automobile which was produced by Chrysler Australia from 1966 to 1967.

Based on the British Singer Gazelle Series VI, the Hillman Gazelle was offered only as a four-door sedan and was essentially an upmarket version of the Hillman Minx VI. It was powered by a  four-cylinder engine producing  net,  more than the Minx thanks to its aluminium cylinder head and twin-barreled Solex carburettor. This aluminium head engine was produced for the Sunbeam Rapier. Chrysler Australia replaced both the Minx and the Gazelle with the Hillman Arrow / Hunter range during 1967.

See also
Hillman

References

 

Gazelle
Cars of Australia
Cars introduced in 1966
Cars discontinued in 1967
Rear-wheel-drive vehicles
Sedans